Huancarqui District is one of fourteen districts of the Castilla Province in the Department of Arequipa in Peru.

Etymology
The name of the district and its capital come from the Quechua Huancar, meaning "drum", and Canque, meaning "you". When the Spanish arrived, it became known as Guancarqui up until 1800, then being known by its current name.

History
Huancarqui is one of the oldest settlements in the province of Castilla, having been populated since pre-Inca times. It is presumed that the first Spaniards who arrived founded the town on Inca cemeteries.

The Incas that conquered the region under Cápac Yupanqui made it into their local headquarters in order to be able to conquer local rival groups. The arrival of these Incas allowed for a unique development of a mixed culture descended from the Wari, Tiwanaku and Inca cultures, as well as the Spanish culture that would arrive later. Under the Spanish, the area was settled in 1549 under direct orders of Martín López de Carvajal, a Conquistador originating from Extremadura, as well as one of the founders of Arequipa.

On May 3, 1955, a government law elevated Huancarqui to a capital town of the homonymous new district. Today the town has a population of approximately 1700 people. Despite it being less developed than neighboring Aplao and Corire, it is nonetheless a well-off touristic spot among visitors.

Geography
Huancarqui is located in they Majes Valley, where the Colca River flows through. It is located below 1 000 meters above sea level and is made up of the districts of Aplao, Uraca and Huancarqui. The terrain is mostly plain and fertile, in comparison to the surrounding deserts.

The climate in the region of Castilla Baja is very hot due to its narrowness and depth, in relation to the plain where the waters have undermined its basin. Average annual temperatures range between 15º and 24 °C. The winter rains on the coast and summer in the mountains. reach only the ends of the valley, which does not receive rain other than very scarce drizzles.

Culture
Like neighboring Majes, Huancarqui is an agricultural district. The area is known locally for its archeologic heritage, such as the many petroglyphs found, as well as a nearby dinosaur-themed park, and nationally for its pisco production, with its many wineries being popular. Fishing is also a popular activity in the district. Touristic attractions include outdoor sports, such as rafting or hiking, or the local gastronomy, with many of its restaurants specializing in traditional Peruvian food.

Religion
Religion is important among the local population, with Catholicism being held in high esteem by the local population. Local festivities, such as the Virgen de Chapi or Our Lady of Mount Carmel are important in the area. During Holy Week, local residents tend to perform traditional activities such as the Via Crucis in the surrounding mountains, as well as traditional Mass services. Folk leyends are also popular with locals, who claim certain areas are haunted.

Transport
Owing to its location in a valley, transport is limited to the roads linking the towns together along the valley, which then connect to the Pan-American Highway to the south, or to neighboring Majes to the east. Both public and private transport usually service these roads.

Notable people
 Tomás Gutiérrez, a coronel who carried out a coup-d'état in Lima in 1872, along with his three brothers, after which only one survived.

See also
 Castilla Province
 Department of Arequipa
 Arequipa

References

Districts of the Castilla Province
Districts of the Arequipa Region